Calothamnus quadrifidus subsp. obtusus is a plant in the myrtle family, Myrtaceae and is endemic to the south-west of Western Australia.  It is similar to other subspecies of Calothamnus quadrifidus except that its leaves are linear and somewhat rough and scaly and the stamen bundles are relatively short.

Description

The flowers are red and arranged in clusters, usually on one side of the stem amongst the older leaves. (The subspecies petraeus and seminudus have similar leaves to obtusus but their stamen bundles are longer.)

Taxonomy and naming
Calothamnus quadrifidus subsp. obtusus was first formally described in 2010 by Alex George in Nuytsia. It had originally been described in 1867 by George Bentham as a form of Calothamnus quadrifidus (Calothamnus quadrifidus f. obtusus) from a specimen collected on the Murchison River by Augustus Oldfield. The epithet obtusus is a Latin word meaning "blunt" or "dull".

Distribution and habitat
Calothamnus quadrifidus subsp. obtusus is found between Shark Bay, Kalbarri and Mullewa in the Carnarvon, Geraldton Sandplains and Yalgoo biogeographic regions. It usually grows in sand in kwongan.

Conservation
Calothamnus quadrifidus subsp. obtusus is classified as "not threatened" by the Western Australian Government Department of Parks and Wildlife.

References

quadrifidus
Myrtales of Australia
Plants described in 2010
Plant subspecies